The Henderson Ministry was the ministry of the eighth Chief Minister of the Northern Territory Australia, Paul Henderson. It was sworn in on 26 November 2007, following the resignation of Clare Martin and her deputy Syd Stirling.

An interim ministry was initially sworn in, lasting for three days after the succession of Henderson and his deputy, Marion Scrymgour, prior to the constitution of a full ministry.

The full ministry saw significant changes from the final Martin ministry, largely due to the decision of Martin and Deputy Chief Minister Syd Stirling to retire to the backbenches while serving out their terms. Delia Lawrie replaced Stirling as Treasurer, while backbenchers Matthew Bonson and Len Kiely were promoted to the ministry. The latter appointment was the cause of some controversy, as Kiely had been forced to resign as Deputy Speaker in 2006 after a sexual harassment incident. Kiely would later lose his seat at the 2008 election in a result largely attributed to the fallout from that scandal. The full ministry also included a number of changes to portfolio makeup; perhaps the most significant being the creation of a ministry for climate change, to be held by Henderson.

On 15 February 2008, following the resignation of Elliot McAdam, Rob Knight was appointed to the ministry.

The Henderson government was re-elected at the 2008 election, but three ministers were defeated: Chris Natt, Len Kiely and Matthew Bonson. The three vacancies were notably filled by three indigenous MLAs, Malarndirri McCarthy, Alison Anderson and Karl Hampton.

The Ministry ended when the Henderson government was defeated at the 2012 Northern Territory election, and was succeeded by the Mills Ministry on 4 September 2012.

First (interim) ministry (26 November 2007 – 29 November 2007)

The interim ministry operated from 26 November 2007 until 29 November 2007.

Second ministry (30 November 2007 – 14 February 2008)

Third ministry (15 February 2008 – 30 June 2008)

Fourth ministry (1 July 2008 – 17 August 2008)

Fifth ministry (18 August 2008 – 3 February 2009)

Sixth ministry (4 February 2009 – 8 February 2009)

Seventh ministry (9 February 2009 – 5 August 2009)

Eighth ministry (6 August 2009 – 3 December 2009)

A reshuffle occurred following the resignation of Alison Anderson from Cabinet on 6 August 2009.

Ninth ministry (4 December 2009 – 8 February 2010)

Tenth ministry (9 February 2010 – 27 October 2011)

Eleventh ministry (28 October 2011 – 28 August 2012)

References

Henderson
Australian Labor Party ministries in the Northern Territory